|}

The Prix Robert Papin is a Group 2 flat horse race in France open to two-year-old thoroughbred colts and fillies. It is run at Chantilly over a distance of 1,200 metres (about 6 furlongs), and it is scheduled to take place each year in July.

History
The event was established in 1892, and it was originally called the Omnium de Deux Ans. It was initially run over 1,100 metres, and was extended to 1,200 metres in 1903. For a period it was held in early August, and it was one of France's first two-year-old races of the season. It reverted to 1,100 metres in 1907, and from this point juveniles could be raced earlier in the year.

The Omnium de Deux Ans was the country's richest race for two-year-olds until 1914. Its prize fund was greater than those of both the Prix Morny and the Grand Critérium. It was abandoned throughout World War I, with no running from 1915 to 1918.

The race was renamed in memory of Robert Papin (1848–1926), a former president of the Société Sportive d'Encouragement, in 1928. It was increased to 1,200 metres in 1929.

The Prix Robert Papin was held at Auteuil in 1940. On this occasion it was contested over 1,400 metres in late October. Its regular length was cut to 1,100 metres in 1942. It was run at Longchamp over 1,000 metres in 1944. Its distance returned to 1,200 metres in 1946, and it began its current spell over 1,100 metres in 1963.

The present system of race grading was introduced in 1971, and the Prix Robert Papin was given Group 1 status. It was relegated to Group 2 level in 1987.

Under Maisons-Laffitte Racecourse are closure on 2020, Prix Robert Papin moved to Chantilly and the race is eligible for geldings .

Records
Leading jockey (7 wins):
 Roger Poincelet – Chesterfield (1946), Coronation (1948), Emperor (1949), Fiere (1955), Neptune (1957), Sly Pola (1959), High Bulk (1960)

Leading trainer (9 wins):
 Charles Semblat – Ardan (1943), Nirgal (1945), Coronation (1948), Emperor (1949), Pharsale (1950), Auriban (1951), Pharel (1952), Cordova (1953), Fiere (1955)

Leading owner (8 wins):
 Marcel Boussac – Ardan (1943), Nirgal (1945), Coronation (1948), Emperor (1949), Pharsale (1950), Auriban (1951), Pharel (1952), Cordova (1953)

Winners since 1976

 The 1977 running took place at Évry.

 The 2010 winner Irish Field was later exported to Hong Kong and renamed Prolific Champion.
 The 2019 running moved to Deauville during unsafely track.

Earlier winners

 1892: Commandeur
 1893: Claret
 1894: Sweet William
 1895: Nacelle
 1896: Vidame
 1897: Cazabat
 1898: John Wyse
 1899: Clairette
 1900: Indian Shore
 1901: Ophelia
 1902: Perm
 1903: Djephte
 1904: Poppee
 1905: Prestige
 1906: Ascalon
 1907: Sauge Pourpree
 1908: Fils du Vent
 1909: Marsa
 1910: Lord Burgoyne
 1911: Montrose
 1912: Gloster
 1913: Mousse de Mer
 1914: Clairet
 1915–18: no race
 1919: Marron
 1920: Guerriere
 1921: Zenoia
 1922: Pavillon
 1923: Le Gros Morne
 1924: Canalette
 1925: Deauville
 1926: Green Flor
 1927: Erica
 1928: Necklace
 1929: Chateau Bouscaut
 1930: Pearl Cap
 1931: Coeur de Lion
 1932: Coque de Noix
 1933: Brantôme
 1934: Stratosphere
 1935: Mistress Ford
 1936: Minaudiere
 1937: Gossip
 1938: Bulle de Savon
 1939: Codor
 1940: Longthanh
 1941: Mirko
 1942: Norseman
 1943: Ardan
 1944: Otero
 1945: Nirgal
 1946: Chesterfield
 1947: Primeur
 1948: Coronation
 1949: Emperor
 1950: Pharsale
 1951: Auriban
 1952: Pharel
 1953: Cordova
 1954: Soya
 1955: Fiere
 1956: L'Astrologue
 1957: Neptune
 1958: Taboun
 1959: Sly Pola
 1960: High Bulk
 1961: Wakamba
 1962: Quiqui
 1963: Djel
 1964: Double Jump
 1965: Kashmir
 1966: Fin Bon
 1967: Zeddaan
 1968: Folle Rousse
 1969: Amber Rama
 1970: My Swallow
 1971: Sun Prince
 1972: Reine du Chant
 1973: Lianga
 1974: Sky Commander

See also
 List of French flat horse races
 Recurring sporting events established in 1892 – this race is included under its original title, Omnium de Deux Ans.

References

 1892–1919, 1920–1949, 1950–1979, 1980–present
 france-galop.com – A Brief History: Prix Robert Papin.
 galopp-sieger.de – Prix Robert Papin (ex Omnium de Deux Ans).
 horseracingintfed.com – International Federation of Horseracing Authorities – Prix Robert Papin (2016).
 pedigreequery.com – Prix Robert Papin – Maisons-Laffitte.

Flat horse races for two-year-olds
Maisons-Laffitte Racecourse
Horse races in France
Recurring sporting events established in 1892
1892 establishments in France